Awry is a 10" vinyl EP by the American experimental electronic music ensemble Biota, released in 1988 by Bad Alchemy.

Track listing

Personnel 
Adapted from the Awry liner notes.

Biota
 Tom Katsimpalis – organ, guitar, bass guitar, banjo, harmonica, tape, percussion
 Mark Piersel – trumpet, guitar, bass guitar, psaltery, electronics, bells, percussion, engineering
 Steve Scholbe – alto saxophone, bass clarinet, flute, guitar, bells, percussion
 William Sharp – tape, electronics, soprano clarinet, engineering
 Gordon H. Whitlow – bass guitar, guitar, piano, organ, accordion, percussion
 Larry Wilson – drums, bongos
 Randy Yeates – mbira, concertina

Additional musicians
 C.W. Vrtacek – piano (B5)
Production and additional personnel
 Bill Tindall – engineering

Release history

References

External links 
 

1988 EPs
Biota (band) albums